Paul Arcelin is a Haitian who lived in Canada for many years in exile from the Duvalier dictatorship because of his political activities. He married a Canadian woman with whom he raised two children in Montréal.

In 1986, following Duvalier's departure, he was asked to be the Special Adviser to General William Regala and chief of staff of his cabinet. He was also the Haitian ambassador to the Dominican Republic during the Prosper Avril government.

Arcelin was also known for being particularly against Jean Bertrand-Aristide. Indeed, he played a key role in the 2004 Haitian rebellion with Guy Philippe. During the rebellion, he participated in some interviews that are available on Radio Canada.

Arcelin was a candidate for the office of president of Haiti. After the rebellion which led to the ouster of Aristide, Arcelin vowed to remain in Haiti to help restore the country.

Education
Arcelin studied in Kingston, Jamaica, Caracas, Venezuela, and at Paris, France, where he presented his thesis: Integration Dominican Republic-Haiti at Sorbonne University. The thesis was praised by former Dominican president Juan Bosch.  Arcelin  also obtained a Master's degree in Administration at the University of Ottawa.

Arcelin went on to teach at Université du Québec à Montréal. He also taught at the following locations:
Javeriana University, Bogotá, Colombia
Marine Academy of War, Santo Domingo, Dominican Republic
Taught history and French in a variety of schools in Quebec

Activism
Together with Irving Davidson, he founded Haiti Recovery Inc., a non-governmental organization that has been recognized by the State Department in Washington D.C. Arcelin also co-founded OHUBARDO, Humanitarian Organization which works in the assistance of Haitian workers in the “bateyes” (Sugar Cane Fields).

He has written for such well-known newspapers as El Nacional of Caracas, Venezuela, El Tiempo (Bogotá, Colombia) and US-based Haïti Observateur.

Paul Arcelin was a main independent candidate for the 2005 elections in Haiti for the Convergence Vers Reconstruction et L'industrialisation D'Haiti (CRIH) party, which he founded and coordinates. This is a coalition of different political parties, unions, community, associations, peasants movements, student groups, artists, professionals, church leaders, merchants, industrialists and a large segment of the Haitian diaspora.

Bibliography
Cercueil sous le bras

References
Profile from Cooperative Research
Boston Globe article
Transcript of KPFA Radio interview that discusses Arcelin
in The Dominion
Fox News article that quotes Arcelin
 Inter-American Commission on Human Rights - 1988 Report on the situation of human rights in Haïti where Arcelin was put on a «death-squad hit list».
 Audio interview in French from Paul Arcelin to Radio Canada
 Another audio interview in French from Paul Arcelin to Radio Canada

Year of birth missing (living people)
Living people
Haitian activists
Haitian educators
Haitian politicians
Haitian non-fiction writers
Haitian male writers
University of Ottawa alumni
Ambassadors of Haiti to the Dominican Republic
Haitian exiles
Haitian expatriates in Canada
Male non-fiction writers